Bror Sven "Jacob" Hård af Segerstad, professionally known as Jacob Hård (born 5 January 1955) is a Swedish sport journalist. He started his career at Radiosporten on Sveriges Radio in 1980 to then start working for Sveriges Television. Hård is one of Sweden's most known sports commentators as he has commentated skiing and athletics events  since the 1980s. Jacob Hård is also known as the voice of Bo A Orm in Lilla Sportspegelns animated series Zoolympiska spelen. He also voiced Tintin in the Swedish dub for the film Tintin and the Temple of the Sun.

References

External links

Living people
1955 births
Swedish sports journalists